Allende is a city in the Mexican state of Coahuila. The city serves as the administrative center for the surrounding municipality of Allende.

History
The name "Allende" is in honor of Ignacio Allende, a hero of Mexico's War of Independence. The town's folk hero is Arnulfo González who was gunned down in the mid-1920s, and has a "corrido" sung by artists such as Vicente Fernández and many others. Prior to 1832 the settlement was known as San Juan de Mata.

Los Zetas Massacre 
In February, 2014, members of the Army, Navy, State, and Federal Police forces began searching for the remains of at least 300 residents of the region, who had been murdered in 2011 and buried in a series of clandestine graves in local ranches. In the Dallas suburbs, the U.S. Drug Enforcement Administration (DEA) had launched Operation Too Legit to Quit after some surprising busts. In one, police had found $802,000, vacuum-packed and hidden in the gas tank of a pickup. The driver said he worked for a guy he knew only as “El Diablo,” the Devil. 

After more arrests, DEA Agent Richard Martinez and Assistant U.S. Attorney Ernest Gonzalez determined that El Diablo was 30-year-old Jose Vasquez, Jr., a Dallas native who’d started selling drugs in high school and was now the leading Zetas cocaine distributor in east Texas, moving truckloads of drugs, guns and money each month. As they prepared to arrest him, Vasquez slipped across the border to Allende, where he sought protection from members of the cartel’s inner circle. But Martinez and Gonzalez saw an opportunity in his escape. If they could persuade Vasquez to cooperate, it would give them rare access to the senior ranks of the notoriously impenetrable cartel and a chance to capture its leaders, particularly the Treviño brothers, who had killed their way onto the list of the DEA’s top targets. Miguel Ángel Treviño was known as Z-40, Omar as Z-42. 

What Martinez wanted were the trackable PINs, or personal identification numbers, of the Treviños’ BlackBerry phones. Vasquez had left the agent plenty of leverage. His wife and mother were still living in Texas. The DEA threatened to imprison Vasquez’s mother and wife if he did not get the trackable PINs for the Treviños. Under pressure to get the phones’ PINs, Vasquez turned to Héctor Moreno, a Zeta lieutenant, using a little leverage of his own. It was Moreno’s brother, Gilberto, who had been caught driving the truck with $802,000 in the gas tank. Facing 20 years in prison, Gilberto had confessed that he was working for the Zetas and that the cash belonged to the Treviño brothers. Vasquez arranged for his lawyer in Dallas to represent Gilberto and promised not to let anyone else in the cartel know about Gilberto’s incriminating statements. Moreno repaid the favor by agreeing to get Vasquez the numbers. 

The Treviños found out; in response, members of the Zetas seized the towns of Allende and Nava, destroyed 80 houses with heavy machinery, and kidnapped approximately 80 families. These people were not seen again, until the operation began uncovering some of their bodies, many of which allegedly had been dissolved with a mixture of diesel fuel and caustic soda in large barrels of improvised "kitchens", in 2014.

Geography 
Allende is also crossed by the railway that connects Saltillo to the border city of Ciudad Acuña (across the river from Del Rio, Texas, United States).

The town's annual festival (fiesta patronal) takes place on 29 August. 
In addition to the municipal seat, the only other two settlements of any size in the municipality are Río Bravo and Chamucero.

Government

Municipal presidents

References

External links
Allende municipal webpage

Populated places in Coahuila
1826 establishments in Mexico